Events from the year 1605 in Sweden

Incumbents
 Monarch – Charles IX

Events

 Hogenskild Bielke and his daughter Ebba Bielke is trialed and judged guilty of treason. 
 Swedish attack on Riga. 
 September - Polish victory in the Battle of Kircholm.

Births

Deaths

 April - Görvel Fadersdotter (Sparre), landowner and county administrator  (born 1509 or 1517)
 3 June - Hogenskild Bielke, soldier and politician (born 1538)

References

 
Years of the 17th century in Sweden
Sweden